Galena Township is an inactive township in Jasper County, in the U.S. state of Missouri.

Galena Township was named for the local galena mining industry.

References

Townships in Missouri
Townships in Jasper County, Missouri